GIEKSA Arena is a multi-purpose stadium in Bełchatów, Poland. It is currently used mostly for football matches and is the home stadium of GKS Bełchatów. The stadium has a capacity of 5,264 people. It was built in 1977 and renovated in 2001–2009.

For 2019–20 and 2020–21 seasons, the stadium was a home for the Ekstraklasa's and Polish Cup's Raków Częstochowa games.
For 2021–22 season, the stadium was a home for the I liga's Skra Częstochowa games.

References

Bełchatów
GKS Bełchatów
Bełchatów
Sports venues in Łódź Voivodeship
Sport in Bełchatów
Buildings and structures in Bełchatów